Trapezites waterhousei is a butterfly of the family Hesperiidae. It is found in Western Australia.

The wingspan is about 25 mm.

The larvae feed on Xerolirion divaricata.

External links
 Australian Caterpillars

Trapezitinae
Butterflies described in 1992